Ulrika Bergman (born 11 June 1975 in Östersund) is a Swedish curler from Solna. She is currently the alternate for the World and Olympic Champion Anette Norberg team. She was the fourth player (threw last rocks) for Margaretha Lindahl in four straight world junior championships from 1993 to 1996. Their best finish was in 1995 when they won the silver medal. In 1997, she switched throwing positions with Lindhal for their debut at the European Championships where they won a silver. Bergman has been Norberg's alternate since 2004, winning an Olympic gold medal in 2006.

Awards
 All-star skip: , .
In 2005 she was inducted into the Swedish Curling Hall of Fame.

References

External links
 

1975 births
Living people
Swedish female curlers
Olympic curlers of Sweden
Curlers at the 2006 Winter Olympics
Olympic gold medalists for Sweden
World curling champions
Olympic medalists in curling
Medalists at the 2006 Winter Olympics
European curling champions
Swedish curling champions